Julian Bensley More (15 June 1928 – 15 January 2010) was a British writer, best known for book and lyrics to musicals Expresso Bongo, Songbook and the English version of Irma La Douce.

His screenwriting credits include the films Chanel Solitaire (1981), The Catamount Killing (1974) and Incense for the Damned (1971).

More's later travel and food writing includes Views from a French Farmhouse (1985), A Taste of Provence (1988) and A Taste of Burgundy (1993).

References 

British lyricists
British screenwriters
English musical theatre lyricists